Ittehad-e-Millat Council, (Hindi: इत्तेहाद-इ-मिल्लत कौंसिल; اتحاد ملت کونسل abbreviated IEMC) is a regional party in Uttar Pradesh, India, founded in 2001. The IEMC's president and founder is Maulana Tauqeer Raza Khan.  and legal consultant is Adv Pradeep Maheshwari

The IEMC contested on 20 seats for the Sixteenth Legislative Assembly of Uttar Pradesh elections and managed to muster total 190,844 votes and win one seat in Bhojipura constituency.

See also

 Uttar Pradesh Legislative Assembly
 16th Legislative Assembly of Uttar Pradesh
 Politics of India

References

2001 establishments in Uttar Pradesh
Political parties established in 2001
Political parties in Uttar Pradesh